Gajniče (in older sources also Goniče or Gojniče) is a small settlement just southwest of Šmarje–Sap in the Municipality of Grosuplje in central Slovenia. The entire municipality is included in the Central Slovenia Statistical Region. The area is part of the historical region of Lower Carniola.

Geography
Gajniče is a clustered village on the southern slope of Roj Hill (330 m), which also has a railroad tunnel. A wet, marshy valley lies below the village, through which Tlake Creek flows, with its source at Vir Spring below the hamlet of Razdrto. The creek flows through the low-lying Snožeti Meadows. Klobušter Hill (396 m) and Mačka Hill (397 m) rise above the settlement to the south.

References

External links

Gajniče on Geopedia

Populated places in the Municipality of Grosuplje